Franz Jakob (November 17, 1891 in Veitsaurach – 10 September 1965 in Ingolstadt) was a German Nazi politician.

Background
Jakob worked as a railroad chief secretary. In 1930 he moved as a member of the Nazi Party in the City Council of Fürth.

He was also member of the Bavarian Landtag and from 1933 to 1940 he was mayor of the city of Fürth.

References

Nazi Party politicians
1891 births
1965 deaths